The Model Scouts, formerly The Model Agent  during its first season in 2009, was an Irish reality documentary on RTÉ Two that followed twelve girls competing for a lucrative modelling contract with IMG.

In 2008 the series followed model scout Fiona Ellis on her search for an Irish supermodel. On her way through Ireland, Ellis spotted eight girls in the entire country and chose the last four of the twelve finalists through applications that she received. Each episode saw the elimination of one or more girls. The winner, Carrie-Anne Burton, won a contract with the Independent Models agency and a cover of Image magazine. Supermodel Erin O'Connor, who was also discovered by Ellis at the beginning of her career, advised the girls. Ellis said that, in contrast to America's Next Top Model, her aim was to give an insight in finding new model talent with serious ambitions without "all the drama".

For its second season in 2010, the show was renamed The Model Scouts. Jeni Rose and David Cunningham of IMG Models were the judges. The girls were taken to London, Paris, Sydney and New York City. The winner, Tabea Weyrauch, was a 16-year-old girl from Derry. She won a one-year contract with IMG, and became the face of A Wear in Ireland and the United Kingdom. She also appeared on the cover of Life, the magazine section of the Sunday Independent.

Series summary

Season one

Contestants
(ages stated are at start of contest)

 Lisa Madden eventually became a contestant on the eighth series of Britain & Ireland's Next Top Model.

Call-out order

 The contestant was eliminated
 The contestant was put through collectively to the next stage
 The contestant was immune from elimination
 The contestant won the competition

 Sadhbh, Miriam, Lisa, and Jennifer entered the competition in episode 2.

Season two

Contestants
(ages stated are at start of contest)

Call-out order

 The contestant was immune from elimination
 The contestant was eliminated
 The contestant won the competition

 In episode 1, Jenni Rose and David Cunningham scouted the cities of Dublin, Cork, Galway, Derry, and Belfast to find twelve aspiring models. After creating a shortlist of thirty girls, the list was reduced to twenty-one models who were taken to Dublin for the final cut. At the end of the episode, nine of the models, Shauneen, Emma, Holly, Aoife, Niamh, Rebecca, Aoibhin, Eve, and Zahra, were eliminated. The remaining twelve moved on to the main competition.

See also
Britain's Next Top Model

References

External links
Season one official site
Season two official site
The full second season on IMG's website

2009 Irish television series debuts
2010 Irish television series endings
Irish reality television series
Modeling-themed reality television series